First Bank is the name used by various financial institutions worldwide. The term, either as whole or as part of a combination of names, may refer to:

International
 First Bank of Nigeria, a Nigerian bank with branches in Ghana, South Africa, Guinea, Gambia, Sierra Leone, DRC, UAE, United States, UK, France, China, etc.
 First National Bank (disambiguation), a name used by various banks worldwide
 First Interstate Bank (disambiguation), a name used by various banks worldwide
 First Commercial Bank (disambiguation), used by a bank in Taipei, Taiwan, as well as several in the United States

Africa
 First Bank of Nigeria, with branches across Nigeria
 Afriland First Bank, in Cameroon, Equatorial Guinea, Congo (Brazzaville) and Sao Tome e Principe

Asia
 First Gulf Bank, in Abu Dhabi, United Arab Emirates
 First Microfinance Bank, in Karachi, Sindh, Pakistan
 First Microfinance Bank, in Dushanbe, Tajikistan
 First Women Bank Limited, in Karachi, Sindh, Pakistan
 First Pacific Bank, a former bank based in Hong Kong

Europe
 First Bank, part of the J.C. Flowers & Co. Group, in Romania
 First Trust Bank, part of the AIB Group, in Belfast, Northern Ireland

United States
 FirstBank Holding Co, also known as 1stBank, a privately held bank based in Lakewood, Colorado with locations in Colorado, California, and Arizona 
 First American National Bank, a defunct bank now part of Amsouth Bancorporation
 First Bancorp, a financial holding company in Southern Pines, North Carolina
 First BanCorp, more commonly known as FirstBank, a financial holding company in Puerto Rico
 First Bank & Trust, headquartered in Evanston, Illinois and serving the Chicago area
 First Bank System, a Minneapolis, Minnesota-based regional bank holding company that had used the trade name First Bank before the holding company was renamed U.S. Bancorp in 1997
 First International Bank, in Watford City, North Dakota
 First Midwest Bank, in Joliet, Illinois
 Seafirst Bank, acquired by Bank of America, known in the early 1970s as Firstbank
 Security First Network Bank, claimed to be the first pure internet bank, in Atlanta, Georgia

Caribbean
 FirstCaribbean International Bank, in Barbados
 FirstBank (Puerto Rico), in Puerto Rico, formerly First Federal

Similarly Named 
 FirstBank Building, part of the Palmer Center complex, is a class A high-rise office building in Colorado Springs, Colorado. The building was known as the Holly Sugar Building
 First American Bank (disambiguation)
 First Commonwealth Bank, a financial services company based in Indiana, Pennsylvania, primarily serving the Western and the Central Pennsylvania regions
 First Federal Bank (disambiguation)
 First Pennsylvania Bank, a bank based in Philadelphia, Pennsylvania. Founded in 1782, it was for decades the oldest bank in the United States until it was acquired by CoreStates Financial Corporation in 1989
 First Security Bank, a privately held company based in Searcy, Arkansas
 First State Bank (disambiguation)
 First Westroads Bank, a locally owned community bank in Omaha, Nebraska, USA, with two branches

Other uses
 First Bank F.C., a Nigerian association football club run by First Bank of Nigeria